Six ships of the French Navy have borne the name Pégase, in honour of Pegasus.

Ships
 , a 74-gun ship of the line, lead ship of  her class
 , a 74-gun 
 , a 
  (1956), a coastal minesweeper
 , a ship used to test torpedoes
  (1985), a

Notes and references

Notes

References

Bibliography 
 
 

French Navy ship names